Pycnandra elegans is a species of trees in the family Sapotaceae. It is found in New Caledonia.

References

External links 

 Pycnandra elegans at Tropicos

elegans
Plants described in 1957
Flora of New Caledonia